Edith A. Moravcsik (born 1939) is a Hungarian-born American linguist.

Career 
Edith A. Moravcsik  was born May 2, 1939 in Budapest, Hungary as the daughter of Gyula Moravcsik. Julius Moravcsik and Michael J. Moravcsik were her brothers. Since 1964, she has been living in the United States. Her early training in Hungary was in Classics.

Education and teaching 
In 1971, she received her Ph.D. in linguistics at Indiana University. Between 1968 and 1976, she was a member of the Language Universals Project at Stanford University under the direction of Joseph Greenberg and Charles Ferguson. After over 30 years of teaching at the University of Wisconsin-Milwaukee, she retired from this institution as professor emeritus in 2009. She was elected an external member of the Hungarian Academy of Sciences in 2019.

Books authored 
 Introducing language typology. 2013. Cambridge University Press.
 An introduction to syntax. Fundamentals of syntactic analysis. 2016. London: Continuum.
 An introduction to syntactic theory. 2016. London: Continuum.

Recent books co-edited 
 Current approaches to syntax (with András Kertész and Csilla Rákosi). 2019. Berlin: de Gruyter.
 Competing motivations in grammar (with Brian MacWhinney and Andrej Malchukov). 2014. Oxford University Press.
 Formulaic language (with Roberta Corrigan, Hamid Ouali, and Kathleen Wheatley). Volumes I-II. 2009. Amsterdam/Philadelphia: Benjamins.

Selected papers 
 2019. “Accounting for variation in language.” Open Linguistics, 2019, 5: 369–382.
 2017. “Syntax.” In Hans Burkhardt & Johanna Seibt & Guido Imaguire & Stamatios Gerogiorgakis (eds.) The handbook of mereology, 544–547. 2017. Munich: Philosophia Verlag.  
 2017. “Number” In A. Y. Aikhenvald and R. M. W. Dixon (eds.) The Cambridge Handbook of Linguistic Typology. 2017. 440–476. Cambridge University Press.
 2016. “On linguistic categories.” Linguistic Typology 2016. 20/2,417-425.
 2011. “Coming to grips with exceptions”. In Horst J. Simon and Heike Wiese (eds.) Expecting the unexpected: Exceptions in grammar. 2011. 31–55. Berlin: Mouton de Gruyter.
 2011. “Explaining language universals”. In Jae Jung Song (ed.) The Oxford handbook of language typology. 2011. 69–89. Oxford University Press.
 2010. “Conflict resolution in syntactic theory.” Studies in Language, 2010. 34:3, 636–669.
 2009. “The distribution of case”. In: Andrej Malchukov and Andrew Spencer (eds.) The Oxford handbook of case. 2009. 231–245. Oxford University Press.
 2009. “Partonomic structures in syntax.” In Vyvyan Evans and Stéphanie Pourcel (eds.) New directions in cognitive linguistics. 2009. 269–285. Amsterdam/Philadelphia: Benjamins.
 2007. “What is universal about typology?” Linguistic Typology, 2007. 11/1, 27–41.
 2003. “A semantic analysis of associative plurals” Studies in Language, 2003, 27:3, 469–503.
 1978. "Agreement." In: Universals of human language, edited by Joseph H. Greenberg, Charles A. Ferguson, and Edith Moravcsik, Stanford: Stanford University Press, 331–374.
 1978. "On the case marking of objects." In: Universals of human language, edited by Joseph H. Greenberg, Charles A. Ferguson, and Edith Moravcsik, Stanford: Stanford University Press, 249–289.

References

External links 
 
 
 hom page
 books
 

1939 births
Living people
Hungarian emigrants to the United States
Linguists
Linguists from Hungary
Members of the Hungarian Academy of Sciences
Women linguists